The governor-general of Finland was the military commander and the highest administrator of Finland sporadically under Swedish rule in the 17th and 18th centuries and continuously in the autonomous Grand Duchy of Finland between 1809 and 1917.

Swedish realm
After the final abolition of the Duchy of Finland and related feudal privileges in the late 16th century, the king of Sweden sporadically granted most or all of Finland under a specially appointed governor-general, who took care of the matters in the eastern part of the country more or less according to his own best judgement. Best known of these officials is count Per Brahe whose reign is still referred to in Finland as the "count's days" (kreivin aikaan), meaning something positive that happens just in time.

List of Swedish governors-general of Finland
Translation in

Grand Duchy of Finland
During the time when Finland was a part of the Russian Empire, the governor-general's position was permanent. He was viceroy of the emperor, who was not personally present in Helsinki, but resided in St Petersburg, just outside Finnish borders. The governor-general was constitutionally the chairman of the Senate of Finland, the government in the autonomous grand duchy. The chairmanship he represented, with two votes in the Senate, belonged to the grand duke of Finland, a title held by the emperor of Russia. The governor-general was the highest representative of the emperor and received his instructions directly from the imperial government in Saint Petersburg.

Finnish citizenship was not required of the governor-general, contrary to all other highest positions such as senators and the minister-secretary of state. Most governors-general were Russians, men whom the emperor trusted as counterparts of potential Finnish separatism. Many of them, up to Baron , however were also made Finnish subjects, by granting them a Finnish nobility rank.

Many of the governors-general were disliked by the Finnish population. The first man on the post, Georg Magnus Sprengtporten, resigned after only a year. Another, Nikolai Bobrikov, was assassinated in 1904 by the Finnish nationalist Eugen Schauman. On the other hand, several governors-general worked in a way that guaranteed the Finnish autonomy in face of the interests of ministers of the imperial court.

The governor-general between 1831 and 1855, Prince Menshikov, sojourned his entire term in St Petersburg, being simultaneously the Russian minister of navy. Gubernatorial duties in Helsinki were cared for by the deputy governor-general. For most of the term, in that position was general .

List of Russian governors-general of Finland
Translation in

See also
Grand Duke of Finland
Duke of Finland
Diet of Finland
Governor-General in the Swedish Realm
Monarchy of Finland
Finnish Minister Secretary of State
List of Finnish rulers

References

 
 
Political history of Finland
Gubernatorial titles
Governor-General
1595 establishments in Europe
16th-century establishments in Finland